Ahmed El Basha (born January 2, 1982) is a Sudanese football defender who plays for Al-Merreikh.

He is member of the Sudan National Football Team. He is a left back, he may also play as defensive midfielder or also as a winger. He was on loan to Libyan club Al-Nasr Benghazi and returned to El-Merreikh in June 2011.

He is known because of his run through the flank and his crosses.

International goals

References

External links

1982 births
Living people
Sudanese footballers
2008 Africa Cup of Nations players
2011 African Nations Championship players
2012 Africa Cup of Nations players
Sudan international footballers
Al-Merrikh SC players
Association football midfielders
Sudan A' international footballers
Sudanese expatriate footballers
Sudanese expatriate sportspeople in Bahrain
Sudanese expatriate sportspeople in Libya
Expatriate footballers in Libya
Expatriate footballers in Bahrain
Busaiteen Club players
East Riffa Club players
Al-Hilal Club (Omdurman) players
Al-Nasr SC (Benghazi) players